The School of Nursing at the University of Texas at Austin confers undergraduate and graduate degrees in the field of nursing. As of 2021, the School has 755 students and its current Dean is Alexa Stuifbergen. In 2021, the School was ranked 21st by U.S. News & World Report in Best Nursing School's: Master's and 23rd in Nursing. The school is located adjacent to the Dell Seton Medical Center, the University's teaching hospital.

History 
The University of Texas School of Nursing was originally established in Galveston, Texas, in 1890 as the John Sealy Hospital Training School. In 1923, the School began offering a Bachelor of Science in Nursing in cooperation with the University of Texas.

In 1960, the first nursing courses were offered on the Austin campus. In 1976, as part of a reorganization of University of Texas' system of nursing schools, the School of Nursing officially became a part of the University of Texas at Austin. In 1974, the School began offering a PhD in Nursing, the seventh school in the nation to do so.

Past Deans 

 Billye J. Brown, 1972–1989
 Dolores V. Sands, 1989–2009
 Alexa Stuifbergen, 2010–present

References 

Nursing schools in Texas
Nursing
1976 establishments in Texas